Talkalakh District is a district of the Homs Governorate in central Syria. Administrative centre is the city of Talkalakh. At the 2004 census, the district had a population of 129,429.

Sub-districts
The district of Talkalakh is divided into four sub-districts or nawāḥī (population as of 2004):
Talkalakh Subdistrict (ناحية تلكلخ): population 62,069.
Hadidah Subdistrict (ناحية حديدة): population 25,998.
Al-Nasirah Subdistrict (ناحية الناصرة): population 16,678.
Al-Hawash Subdistrict (ناحية الحواش): population 24,684.

References

 

 
Districts of Homs Governorate